The Law of Property Act 1925 (c 20) is a statute of the United Kingdom Parliament. It forms part of an interrelated programme of legislation introduced by Lord Chancellor Lord Birkenhead between 1922 and 1925. The programme was intended to modernise the English law of real property. The Act deals principally with the transfer of freehold or leasehold land by deed.

The LPA 1925, as amended, provides the core of English land law, particularly as regards many aspects of freehold land which is itself an important consideration in all other types of interest in land.

Background
The keynote policy of the act was to reduce the number of legal estates to two – freehold and leasehold – and generally to make the transfer of interests in land easier for purchasers. Other policies were to regulate mortgages and as to leases, to regulate mainly their assignment, and to tackle some of the lacunae, ambiguities and shortcomings in the law of property. Innovations included the default creation of easements under section 62 to reduce unintended denial of access, and statutory enlargement under section 153 (applications to convert very long leasehold to freeholds, where no rent has been paid or demanded for a long period of time).

The Act followed a series of land law and policy reforms that had been begun by the Liberal government starting in 1906. This is how one American legal scholar, Morris Raphael Cohen, described it:

Provisions

Part I – General principles as to legal estates, equitable interests and powers
Section 1 sets out the basic structure of the newly reformed legal estates—"an estate in fee simple absolute in possession" (commonly referred to as freehold), and "a term of years absolute" (leasehold). Old estates in land—fee tail and life interests—are converted by s.1 so as to "take effect as equitable interests". Section 3 sets out how these equitable interests have effect.

Part II – Contracts, conveyances and other instruments
Section 70 of the 1925 Act should be considered in conjunction with schedules 1 and 3 when considering interests that override, most notably that to be in receipts of rents and profits is no longer an overriding interest.

Section 84 of the Act sets out the powers of an appointed authority to alter or remove restrictive covenants on property deeds. This power was later transferred to the Lands Tribunal by the Law of Property Act 1969, and subsequently to the Upper Tribunal by the Transfer of Tribunal Functions (Lands Tribunal and Miscellaneous Amendments) Order 2009.

Part III – Mortgages, rentcharges, and powers of attorney

Part IV – Equitable interests and things in action
Section 136 provides for written notice of an assignment of a debt or "thing in action" to a third party.

Part V – Leases and tenancies
 Abolished the last legal statutes relating to Copyhold, a successor to the feudal system of villeinage where a tenant was obligated to provide special duties and services to mesne lord in return for manorial land.

Part VI – Powers

Part VII – Perpetuities and accumulations

Part VIII – Married women and lunatics
Sections 167-170 have been repealed by Statute Law (Repeals) Act 1969 (c. 52). Section 170 has been repealed by Mental Health Act 1959 (c. 72) Sch. 8 Pt. I.

Part IX – Voidable dispositions
These sections govern fraud; s.172 was repealed (subject to non-application to then-pending bankruptcies) by the Insolvency Act 1985.

s.173 Every voluntary disposition of land (the main example is a gift) made with intent to defraud a later buyer is voidable at the instance of that buyer. And no such disposition shall be deemed to have been made with intent to defraud by reason only that a subsequent conveyance for valuable consideration was made, if such subsequent conveyance was made after 28 June 1893.
s.174 No acquisition made in good faith, without fraud or unfair dealing, of any reversionary (landlord's or future) interest in real or personal property, for money or money's worth, shall be liable to be opened or set aside merely on the ground of under value. In this subsection "reversionary interest" includes an expectancy or possibility. This expressly does not affect the jurisdiction of the court to set aside or modify unconscionable bargains.

Part X – Wills and probate

Part XI – Miscellaneous
Section 184 states that in cases of simultaneous death (where there is no evidence as to who lived longer), the deaths will be assumed to have occurred in order of age, oldest first.

Amendments
Changes have taken place since the commencement of the Land Registration Act 2002.

See also
English property law
English trusts law
Land Registration Act 1925
Land Registration Act 2002
Exchanging contracts

Notes

References

References
WT Murphy, T Flessas and S Roberts, Understanding Property Law (4th edn Sweet and Maxwell, London 2003)
C Harpum, S Bridge and M Dixon, Megarry & Wade: The Law of Real Property (7th edn Sweet and Maxwell 2008)

Acts of the Parliament of the United Kingdom concerning England and Wales
United Kingdom Acts of Parliament 1925
English trusts law
English property law
Housing legislation in the United Kingdom